Dag Dokter!  is a 1978 Dutch drama film directed by Ate de Jong.

Cast
Matthijs van Heijningen	... 	Fat man
Kitty Janssen	... 	Elizabeth Delfman
Derek de Lint	... 	Theo van Delft
Dick Swidde	... 	Mr. Koppers
André van den Heuvel	... 	Bernard Delfman
Huub van der Lubbe	... 	Maxim
Monique van de Ven	... 	Ingrid Sanders
Bill Ward	... 	Jimmy Sanders
Astrid Wijn	... 	Marjan van Dijk

External links 
 

1978 films
1970s Dutch-language films
Dutch drama films
Films directed by Ate de Jong